Sokolov District is a district in the Karlovy Vary Region of the Czech Republic. Its capital is the town of Sokolov.

Administrative division
Sokolov District is divided into two administrative districts of municipalities with extended competence: Sokolov and Kraslice.

List of municipalities
Towns are marked in bold:

Březová - 
Bublava - 
Bukovany - 
Chlum Svaté Maří - 
Chodov - 
Citice - 
Dasnice - 
Dolní Nivy - 
Dolní Rychnov - 
Habartov - 
Horní Slavkov - 
Jindřichovice - 
Josefov - 
Kaceřov - 
Krajková - 
Královské Poříčí -
Kraslice - 
Krásno - 
Kynšperk nad Ohří - 
Libavské Údolí - 
Loket - 
Lomnice - 
Nová Ves -
Nové Sedlo - 
Oloví - 
Přebuz - 
Rotava - 
Rovná - 
Šabina -
Šindelová - 
Sokolov - 
Staré Sedlo - 
Stříbrná - 
Svatava - 
Tatrovice - 
Těšovice - 
Vintířov - 
Vřesová

Geography

Sokolov District borders Germany in the north. The terrain is characterized by two mountain ranges with a forested landscape, between which there is an unforested depression. The territory extends into five geomorphological mesoregions: Ore Mountains (north), Sokolov Basin (centre), Slavkov Forest (south), Cheb Basin (small part in the west) and Fichtel Mountains (very small part in the northwest).

The most important river is the Ohře, which flows across the district from west to east and drains the entire territory. Its longest tributary in the area is the Svatava. The Teplá River forms forms part of the southeastern district border. There are several water reservoirs and artificial lakes created by reclamation after coal mining. The largest body of water is Medard Lake.

There is one protected landscape area, located in the south of the district: Slavkovský les.

Demographics

Most populated municipalities

Economy
The largest employers with its headquarters in Sokolov District and at least 500 employers are:

Transport
The D6 motorway from Karlovy Vary to Cheb (part of the European routes E48 and E49) passes through the district.

Sights

The most important monuments in the district, protected as national cultural monuments, are:
Jeroným Mine in Podstrání
Artificial water channel Dlouhá stoka (partly)
Pilgrimage area Chlum Svaté Maří with the Church of the Assumption of the Virgin Mary and Saint Mary Magdalene

The best-preserved settlements, protected as monument reservations and monument zones, are:
Loket (monument reservation)
Horní Slavkov
Dolní Rychnov
Královské Poříčí

The most visited tourist destination is the Loket Castle.

References

External links

Sokolov District profile on the Czech Statistical Office's website

 
Districts of the Czech Republic